My Dog Rusty is a 1948 American drama film directed by Lew Landers and starring Ted Donaldson, John Litel and Ann Doran. It was part of the eight-film Rusty series of films produced by Columbia Pictures, about a boy and his valiant German Shepherd.

Plot

Cast
Source for uncredited:
 Ted Donaldson as Danny Mitchell 
 John Litel as Hugh Mitchell 
 Ann Doran as Ethel Mitchell 
 Mona Barrie as Dr. Toni Cordell 
 Whitford Kane as Joshua Michael Tucker 
 Jimmy Lloyd as Rodney Pyle 
 Lewis L. Russell as Mayor Fulderwilder 
 Flame as Rusty
 Olin Howland as Frank Foley (uncredited)
Harry Harvey as Mr. Hebble (uncredited)
Ferris Taylor as Bill Worden (uncredited)
 Dwayne Hickman as Nip Worden (uncredited)
David Ackles as Tuck Worden (uncredited)
Jack Rice as Jack (uncredited)
 Minta Durfee as Mrs. Laura Foley (uncredited)
Jessie Arnold as Mrs. Stokes (uncredited)
Fred Aldrich as Truck driver (uncredited)

References

External links
 

1948 films
1948 drama films
American drama films
Films directed by Lew Landers
Columbia Pictures films
American black-and-white films
Rusty (film series)
1940s English-language films
1940s American films